Ninja Hattori-kun episodes include a 1966 television drama, 1981 anime and a 2013 anime. Only the 1981 and 2013 anime include the Indian dub (English, Tamil, Telugu, Malayalam, Kannada, Bangla, Marathi, Hindi, Korean and Vietnamese) episode titles in English. The 1966 TV drama was aired only in Japan. All dub episodes of the 1981 anime are 18 minutes long and consist of three Japanese episodes. There are also 11 special episodes of Ninja Hattori released only in Japan, also there are five movies of Ninja Hattori.

1966  TV Drama

Season 1
Season 1 official title was 'Ninja Hattori-kun'.

Season 2
Season 2 official title was 'Ninja Hattori + Ninja Monster Jippō'.

1981  Anime

Season 1

Season 2

Season 3

Season 4

Season 5
189: Rice planting competition (田植えに挑戦の巻)
190: A strange confession (おかしな告白の巻)
192: Shishimaru is being kidnapped (誘拐された獅子丸の巻)
193: I just hate cameras (カメラはキライキライの巻)
195: Improving the robot (ロボットに強くなろうの巻)
198: Kenichi is a man (ケン一氏は男でござるの巻)
199: Tsubame Ninja Love Sparks Technique (ツバメ忍法恋火花の巻)
200: A challenge to stop mom (ママ上足どめ作戦の巻)
206: A western stock farm (西部劇牧場の巻)
207: Papa's confidence (パパの自信タップリ日曜大工の巻)
209: An incident on father's day (父の日のできごとの巻)
210: Leave, Shishimaru (スッポン獅子丸を放せの巻)
211: The dumb old policeman (どじなおまわりさんの巻)
214: Afraid of cakes? (ケーキが怖いの巻)
215: Beware of goods displayed at bazaar (バザー・出品作にご用心の巻)
217: A bad new classmate (つむじまがりの転校生の巻)
218: Doing one best thing a day (やりぬくぞ一日一善の巻)
219: Catching crayfish (忍法ザリガニつりの巻)
283: The culprit is a secret (犯人の名はヒミツにすべしの巻)
285: Very busy with ninja change yourself technique (忍法変り身大忙しの巻)
286: Kenichi starts zen meditation (座禅をはじめたケン一氏の巻)
301: Yumeko's personal invitation (夢子ちゃんの手作りご招待の巻)
307: Teacher is the best fisherman (先生はルアーの名人だの巻)
311: Shishimaru suffers from stomach trouble (お腹をこわしたシンゾウの巻)
312: Teacher's Instant Camera (先生のインスタントカメラの巻)
314: The forgotten lottery (忘れていた宝くじの巻)
315: Teach me how to sleep (眠れる方法教えるでござるの巻)
316: Yumeko poses for the painting (モデルになった夢子ちゃんの巻)
317: Shishimaru has no confidence (自信をなくした獅子丸の巻)
319: Mama's pampering (ママ上のえこひいきの巻)
320: Let's stop sir's hiccups (先生のシャックリをとめろの巻)
322: How an ad balloon comes to rescue (アドバルーンで助けてぇの巻)
325: Yumeko's sweater which got shrunk (縮んだ夢子殿のセーターの巻)
332: The head of the statue gives away (彫刻の首が落ちたの巻)
333: Kenichi's talent is exploding (ケン一氏才能の爆発でござるの巻)
340: Sir is having trouble with his mom (先生氏の苦手はお母さんの巻)
341: The scary snowlady (雪女はこわいよォの巻)
356: Ninja technique of crow puppets (忍法カラス操りの巻)
360: Sir is in love (先生氏が恋をしたの巻)
366: Flying range of pigeons (とんだはとレースの巻)
368: Restoring sir's reputation (先生の名誉回復作戦の巻)
370: Shishimaru is a ninja dog (獅子丸は忍者犬でござるの巻)
373: The bear uproar the sky to rein (スキー場はクマ騒動の巻)
378: Recover the policemen's pistol (おまわりさんのピストルを取り返せの巻)
380: Kenichi is having a very bad stomach ache (ケンちゃんのおなか大ピンチの巻)
384: Beware of compliments (おせじにご用心の巻)
411: Ninja bowling war (忍法ボウリング合戦の巻)
413: A big discovery, African (大発見！アフリカグモの巻)
414: Shishimaru wants to become a bronze statue(銅像になりたい獅子丸の巻)

11 Special Episodes
All these special episodes were part of 1981-1987 anime. It consists of total 11 episodes.

Movies

2013 Anime

Season 1

Season 2

Season 3

Season 4

Season 5

Season 6

References

Ninja Hattori-kun
Ninja Hattori-kun